Gradation is the first compilation album by Japanese singer Shizuka Kudo. It was released on November 30, 1988, through Pony Canyon. The album includes all five singles released by Kudo at the time, from "Kindan no Telepathy" through "Mugon... Iroppoi", their coupling songs, as well as one new song, entitled "X'mas ga Ippai", recorded specifically for the compilation. Gradation was re-released in gold CD format on March 21, 1989.

Commercial performance
Gradation debuted at number two on the Oricon Albums Chart, with 182,000 units sold. The album spent fourteen weeks in the top twenty, of which nine were spent in the top ten. It charted in the top 100 for twenty-one weeks, logging a reported total sales of 600,000 copies during its chart run, making Gradation Kudo's best-selling album. The compilation ranked at number nine on the year-end Oricon Albums Chart for the year 1989, marking her first and only entry into the year-end top ten.

Track listing
All tracks composed and arranged by Tsugutoshi Gotō.

Charts

Standard edition

Re-issue edition

Release history

References

1988 compilation albums
Shizuka Kudo albums
Pony Canyon compilation albums